The 1911 Texas Longhorns football team represented the University of Texas at Austin in the 1911 college football season.

Schedule
The following table refers to the Sports Reference database.

References

Texas
Texas Longhorns football seasons
Texas Longhorns football